MUZU was an independent online music video site with the largest legal catalogue of online music videos. The video catalogue was licensed by all major record labels Universal Music, Warner Music, Sony Music, independent music labels and niche music content owners.

Content includes concerts, music videos, lyric videos, interviews, music documentaries and lots more. MUZU also powered music video solutions on hundreds of sites and platforms including Microsoft Xbox, Samsung, Sony, LG and Philips Smart TV's along some of the largest sites in the world including: Last.fm, The Guardian, Mail Online, The Telegraph, Bild.de, NME, Rolling Stone, Metacafe and many more. MUZU.TV was founded in Ireland by Ciarán Bollard and Mark French and operated in over 19 countries with offices in Dublin, London and Germany.

MUZU generated revenue through premium advertising solutions; Artists, labels, broadcasters and all music content owners got a revenue share of the advertising revenue generated from plays of their videos on and off the site.

The company called a creditors meeting on 22 October 2015 and revealed that it is heading into liquidation and that Michael Leydon has been appointed liquidator.

Company history

Before the launch Sony BMG signed an agreement with MUZU to allow more than 6,000 videos by artists, including The Ting Tings and Kylie Minogue, to appear on the site, with a further 2,000 hours of footage from entities such as Cherry Red, Eagle Rock Entertainment, Hollywood Music, Ministry of Sound, Ninja Tune and Planet Rock Profiles. Converse, Heineken International, O2, Pioneer Corporation, Ray-Ban and Sony were among the earliest companies to advertise on the website. On 20 August 2008, it was announced that a deal had been signed with ITN, which gave MUZU access to archive footage of TV shows such as The Tube and Calendar Goes Pop.

EMI signed a deal on 16 January 2009 which permitted the website to feature more than 5,000 videos. On 19 January 2009, it was announced that Beggars Group had signed. On 27 January 2009, Cooking Vinyl announced it had signed a global deal, with its founder commenting that MUZU TV was "purpose-built for the music industry and we believe it holds great revenue potential". On 21 July 2009, it was announced that Merlin Network, which had previously refused both MySpace and YouTube, had signed. Announced on 25 January 2010 were deals with AOL Music, Bebo and the Telegraph Media Group. In January 2010, Muzu.tv agreed to give them access to its video library in exchange for a share of advertising revenue. At the Muzu also provided a legal music service, and had otherwise signed deals with Irish Independent, Communicorp, Spinner UK, Drowned In Sound, Habbo Hotel, Virtual Festivals, Mama Group, Meanfiddler, and the Fly Magazine. The Samsung Group said in January 2010 it would allow the development of a MUZU app for its televisions. In February 2010, Muzu's new jukebox music video feature faced competition from an almost identical feature released by YouTube. In 2011, it was made available on Metacafe. In November 2011, Sony started offering Muzu videos through its Sony Entertainment Network on several home entertainment devices. The MUZU.TV app became available on Xbox 360s in December 2011.

In 2013, the catalogue of music videos, concerts, interviews, and music documentaries stood at 130,000. It claimed at the time to have the "largest legal catalogue of music videos available on the web licensed by major record labels and the independent sector." That year it partnered with Last.fm for "scrobbling." Muzu was making a profit in late 2013, with backing by Bill McCabe. Ciaran Bollard was CEO of Muzu. In 2014, Muzu.tv and The Guardian were recordings bands such as Klaxons for a live series. In October 2015, MUZU announced it was shutting down. After struggling to pay rightsholders for some time, MUZU, which was free, ad-supported and available in 23 countries, will go into liquidation.

Awards
The Irish Internet Association named Bollard and French as the 2009 Net Visionaries. IIA Chair Maeve Kneafsey announced the winner at a ceremony on 21 May 2009 by describing the website as "an inspiration to the current and future generations of internet entrepreneurs who know that the internet means that there are no boundaries on what we can do in Ireland, the only limit being our imagination". Bollard and French spoke at the Dublin Web Summit on internet business in Trinity College Dublin on 4 February 2010.

References

External links
 MUZU TV

Companies based in Dublin (city)
Online music stores of Ireland
Internet properties established in 2008
Defunct video on demand services